Antonio Paulino Limpo de Abreu, Viscount of Abaeté (22 September 1798 - 14 September 1883) was a Portuguese-born Brazilian magistrate, diplomat and politician. He served as Prime Minister of Brazil from 1858 to 1859.

He graduated in law at the University of Coimbra in 1820, he was an external judge in São João del-Rei, district ombudsman, judge, councilor, deputy general, governor of Minas Gerais (1833), minister and President of the Council of Ministers (Prime Minister). He was a senator of the Empire of Brazil from 1847 to 1883, and President of the Senate from 1861 to 1873.

As a diplomat, he carried out several missions in Montevideo and in the Argentine Confederation.

He was President of the Council of Ministers and simultaneously Minister of the Navy.

References

1798 births
1883 deaths
Brazilian nobility
People from Lisbon
Prime Ministers of Brazil
University of Coimbra alumni
Members of the Senate of the Empire of Brazil